NTR: Kathanayakudu is a 2019 Indian Telugu-language biographical drama film based on the real life and acting career of N. T. Rama Rao (NTR). It was directed by Krish Jagarlamudi and produced by Nandamuri Balakrishna, Sai Korrapati Ranganatha, Vishnu Vardhan Induri under NBK Films, Vaaraahi Chalana Chitram, Vibri Media banners. It is the first installation of a two-part film. The film stars an ensemble cast with Nandamuri Balakrishna, as his father N. T. Rama Rao, Vidya Balan in lead roles. Music is composed by M. M. Keeravani. The film has a sequel, NTR: Mahanayakudu, that showcases the political journey of Rama Rao.

Plot
In 1984, Nandamuri Basava Ramatarakam asks Nandamuri Harikrishna for a photo album of her husband, N. T. Rama Rao, while he was younger. In 1947, Rama Rao works as a sub-registrar at Guntur sub-courts. He quits and decides to turn into a film star. For which his ideal companion, Basavaramatarakam and his loyal, affectionate brother Nandamuri Trivikrama Rao gives full-fledged support. Now Rama Rao reaches Madras, to meet the director L. V. Prasad who introduces him to the director B. A. Subba Rao and he is selected without an audition for the film Palletoori Pilla. On the set, he gets acquainted with star hero Akkineni Nageswara Rao, and both become good friends. Unfortunately, the movie gets delayed due to financial problems. Meanwhile, he is introduced in the movie Mana Desam as a cameo and also gets an opportunity in the Vijaya Productions banner on monthly wages who produce his first film Shavukaru which becomes a disaster. After that, Nagireddy & Alur Chakrapani plan another project Pathala Bhairavi when everybody suggests the name of Akkineni Nageswara Rao but director K. V. Reddy insists on Rama Rao as Thota Ramudu which becomes a blockbuster and establishes Rama Rao as the first Super Star on the Indian screen. Soon, he shifts his family to Madras.

During that time, a severe drought affected the Rayalaseema region when Rama Rao unites several industry stalwarts and collects donations from the public because of which clashes arrive between Nagireddy & Rama Rao. Angered, Rama Rao leaves their production and starts his banner National Art Theatres introducing Trivikrama Rao as a producer associating with his brother-in-law Rukmanandha Rao. He also allows his friends T. Prakash Rao, D. Yoganand, and T. V. Raju. Afterward, Nagireddy & Chakrapani again approach Rama Rao and request him to come back and he agrees. While filming Mayabazar, everyone objects him to playing Lord Krishna's role, but he enthralls everyone with his divine attire. Later on, P. Pullaiah makes a devotional movie Sri Venkateswara Mahatyam there onwards, people adore him as a deity, and devotees who visit Tirupathi complete their journey only after seeing Rama Rao.

Time passes, Rama Rao couple is blessed with 8 sons & 4 daughters. At present, Rama Rao plans a project Seetharama Kalyanam in the role of Ravana, but no one comes forward to direct, so, he takes the project for which he toils in a steady position for 20 hours in a single shot. Thereafter, a tragic incident, when he is on the set of Irugu Porugu, his elder son Rama Krishna passes away. Yet, he withstands and completes the shoot, showing his dedication to movies. Years roll by, and Rama Rao & Nageswara Rao have been honored with Padma Shri by Govt of India where they are disdained as Madrasis by Prime minister Indira Gandhi when Rama Rao affirms that the pair belongs to Andhra Pradesh. Hereafter, Nageswara Rao shifts the Industry to Hyderabad but Rama Rao stays back to find a permanent solution for the recognition of the Telugu people. Eventually, Prime Minister declares a national emergency in the country when a lot of atrocities occur and Rama Rao turns against them. During the time of the '70s, Rama Rao decides to construct Ramakrishna Cine Studios in memory of his deceased son, when his career is at a low. So, he makes a prestigious project Daana Veera Soora Karna in his direction, playing 3 vital roles, taking care of the production department, and completing it within 38 days which becomes a huge blockbuster. After that, he grabs several hits, such as Adavi Ramudu, Yamagola, Vetagaadu etc.

Then, Diviseema cyclone effect hits Andhra Pradesh which creates devastation when Nageswara Rao also accompanies Rama Rao and they again collect donations for their welfare. There, a transformation occurs and Rama Rao decides to spend the rest of his life in public service. He consults various scholarly people and even the public requests him to step into politics. At that moment, the ruling party starts questioning Rama Rao's son-in-law and Minister of Communication Nara Chandrababu Naidu, but he maintains patience. Simultaneously, the Chief Ministers of Andhra Pradesh are continuously changing the center's command. Bhavanam Venkatarami Reddy, the childhood friend of Rama Rao, becomes the 8th Chief Minister and he invites Rama Rao to his swearing-in ceremony. There, Rama Rao meets a Congress party leader Nadendla Bhaskar Rao who, too, encourages him, with an assurance of his backing. At the age of 60, Rama Rao decides to establish a party, for which his entire family opposes except his son Nandamuri Harikrishna. Though Basavaramatarakam is disinterested, she respects her husband's decision and gives her warm comfort. Finally, the movie ends with Rama Rao announcing his party name, Telugu Desam.

Cast

Cameo appearances
Source: Eenadu

Soundtrack 

The original score and soundtrack for both NTR: Kathanayakudu and NTR: Mahanayakudu were composed by M. M. Keeravani, marking his second collaboration with Krish and his consecutive fourth and fifth collaborations with Balakrishna. The music rights were acquired by Lahari Music. The audio and trailer launch, for the two films collectively, was initially scheduled to be held on 16 December 2018 in Nimmakuru, Krishna district, the birthplace of NTR. It was later held at JRC Convention Center, Hyderabad on 21 December.

Production

Development 
On 6 February 2017, Balakrishna announced that he will be making a biopic film on his father, N. T. Rama Rao, showcasing characteristics unknown to the public. Ever since, the ground work for the film has been under progress. Initially Ram Gopal Varma was slated to direct the movie, but later, he dropped out citing "creative differences" with Balakrishna. Teja was announced to direct movie following speculations in September 2017. Puri Jagannadh and Deva Katta were also considered by the film makers who settled with Teja. According to reports, Teja commenced work on the film. Balakrishna wanted to include as many songs as possible in the film which was opposed by director Teja. This, along with other "creative differences", led Teja to resign from the film in late April 2018, a month after the muhurat shot. In an interview with TV9 Telugu in May 2019, Teja stated he left the direction as he felt directing NTR's biopic is out of capabilities and thus wouldn't do justice to NTR, and denied any differences with Balakrishna.

It was then reported that the filmmakers approached several directors, including K. Raghavendra Rao, Krishna Vamsi, P. Vasu and Puri Jagannadh. Raghavendra Rao reportedly declined due to health issues. Speculations arose that Balakrishna would be directing the film apart from acting in it. Eventually Krish was signed in. He was directing Kangana Ranaut-starred Manikarnika: The Queen of Jhansi (2019) and made a controversial exit from it to direct the biopic. In late June, the filmmakers confirmed the biopic to be a one-part film thrashed reports of it being a two-part film as rumours. In July, The Hans India reported that Balakrishna was offered , the highest amount ever offered for his film, by Sony Pictures in return for the rights of the film. However, Balakrishna declined the offer to produce as he intended to make it himself. Thus he established his own production firm "NBK Films" marking his debut as a producer. The film was tentatively titled NTR – The Biopic before the makers announced in early October to release the biopic in two parts – NTR: Kathanayakudu and NTR: Mahanayakudu. Both the films together are referred to as NTR biopic.

Casting 
In October 2017, reports surfaced that Mokshagna, son of Balakrishna, is being considered to play the cameo role of teenage-NTR, making his debut in films. However, the plans did not come to fruition. Further reports from March 2018 suggested that the filmmakers considered Sharwanand to be an option. Balan was approached the same month to portray the role of NTR's wife Basavatarakam marking her debut in Telugu cinema and, in July, was officially roped in. Paresh Rawal was considered for the role of Nadendla Bhaskara Rao, but Sachin Khedekar was signed in. Bengali-actor Jisshu Sengupta was roped in to portray the character of L. V. Prasad marking his debut in Telugu cinema.

In early August, Rana Daggubati revealed that he will be playing the role of N. Chandrababu Naidu, NTR's second son-in-law and then Chief Minister of united Andhra Pradesh, thus marking his first time playing the role of a living person on screen. Later in September, Sumanth revealed his role as his grandfather, Akkineni Nageswara Rao. In October, Nandamuri Kalyan Ram was confirmed to play the role of his father Nandamuri Harikrishna. Daggubati Raja was cast in the role of Nandamuri Trivikrama Rao, Rama Rao's brother, marking Raja's return to films after nearly two decades. In December, Vennela Kishore was roped in to play the role of NTR's manager. Prakash Kovelamudi was signed in to play the role of his father Raghavendra Rao. Balakrishna's grandson Aryaveer, then a 7-month-old toddler, played the role of child Balakrishna in a cameo appearance marking his debut in cinema.

Filming 
The muhurat shot (first shot) was held on 29 March 2018 with a ceremonial puja at Ramakrishna Cine Studios, Hyderabad. Balakrishna dressed up as Duryodhana and started with his father's famous dialogue "Emantivi Emantivi" from the movie Daana Veera Soora Karna (1977). The event witnessed an attendance of several notable people of Telugu cinema and Vice President Venkaiah Naidu, who the muhurat (first) clap. A month later, in late April, the film fell into jeopardy after Teja exited the production. After Krish was roped in to direct, principal photography started in early July.

The first schedule of the shooting took place until 24 July. Sengupta started shooting in early July and wrapped up at the end of November. The team met with Chandrababu Naidu in August seeking his inputs for the portrayal of his character by Rana and shot his scenes during August–September. Kalyan Ram shot his scenes during September. In late November to early December, Balakrishna took a break from shooting as he partook in campaigning for Telugu Desam Party in the backdrop of 2018 Telangana Legislative Assembly election. Vennela Kishore's scenes were shot during December. By mid-December, most of the filming except the scenes of  has completed.

Several scenes were shot at NTR's house in Abids, Hyderabad, where he lived during 1980s before moving to Banjara Hills in the 1990s. In an interview, Balan stated that she spoke to Balakrishna and his family to get familiarized to the character of Basavatarakam. The News Minute reported that Balakrishna would be portraying in 62 different depictions of NTR in his various films. The filming was wrapped up within 3 months. According to Krish, the shooting took 56 days. The film was reportedly made on a budget of  becoming the most expensive film venture of Balakrishna's career.

Post-production 
The film's post-production was completed in early January 2019.

Release

Certification 
In early January 2019, a week before the scheduled release on 9 January, the film was up for certification by the Central Board of Film Certification. The board sought No Objection Certificates from various family members of NTR, former Chief Minister of united Andhra Pradesh Nadendla Bhaskara Rao and NTR's second wife Lakshmi Parvathi as several characters portrayed in the film remain alive. Reportedly, Parvathi filed objections with the board. Previously, she threatened to take legal action if she was not asked for her permission to portray her role. Eventually, the board cleared the movie with a U certificate without any cuts.

Marketing 
In December 2017, a teaser was shot by then-director Teja to announce the biopic. However, the teaser was not released. The film makers established 100 idols of Rama Rao at 100 theaters in Andhra Pradesh and Telangana when the film was released.

Theatrical release 
During the muhurat shot event in late March 2018, then director Teja announced his intentions to release the film during Dussehra festivities. After Teja's exit, a release on the eve of Sankranthi in 2019 was considered due to upcoming elections in 2019 to the Andhra Pradesh Legislative Assembly and the Indian general election. The elections would trigger the enforcement of the Model Code of Conduct – a set of guidelines to be followed by the political parties and candidates during the election process – by the Election Commission of India thus blocking the film's release until after the elections. In early October 2018, the filmmakers announced that it would be released on 9 January 2019. The film, as it was scheduled to be released only a few months before the 2019 general elections, was speculated to not portray controversial history of NTR's film career.

Screenings 
NTR: Kathanayakudu was released, as planned, on 9 January 2019 in theatres worldwide in 1,100 screens; with more than 1,000 screens in Telugu-speaking states of Andhra Pradesh and Telangana to much fanfare. A limited number of screens were arranged in Tamil Nadu, Karnataka and Maharashtra in India and in the US, Canada, Australia and the Gulf countries where there is a presence of Telugu diaspora.

Distribution 
Vintage Creations, Padmakar Cinemas and USHA Pictures distributed the film in Andhra Pradesh; Asian Cinemas, along with other minor stakeholders, distributed in Telangana; SPI Cinemas in Tamil Nadu; AA Films in North India and US Telugu Movie LLC in the US. The filmmakers reportedly planned to sell the satellite and digital rights of the films – NTR: Kathanayakudu and NTR: Mahanayakudu – separately so as to recuperate a major chunk of production costs.

Home video 
Due to NTR: Kathanayakudu poor performance at the box office, the filmmakers postponed the release of the film's sequel, NTR: Mahanayakudu, which was scheduled for 8 February 2019 and instead premiered NTR: Kathanayakudu on Amazon Prime Video on 8 February. The makers intended the OTT release to reach a wider audience and act as a marketing stunt for the sequel.

Reception

Critical response 
Sangeetha Devi Dundoo reviewing for The Hindu wrote that the film is an ode to NTR with strong background score and cinematography building up on the relations between NTR and Akkineni Nageswara Rao, however lacks drama and focuses more on idolizing Rama Rao rather than exploring his personal life and his flaws. Manoj Kumar R. reviewing for The Indian Express rated the film 2.5/5 and criticized that director Krish did not portray NTR from a human perspective and rather stuck to a divinely depiction like a messiah. He further citicized that the film looked nothing more than a stitch of NTR's life known to public. He praised Balakrishna's performance in the role of his father and a worthy moments of NTR's life and his accomplishments when one watches the film as a tribute to NTR. Suresh Kavirayani reviewing for Deccan Chronicle gave a 4/5 rating and wrote that the film is a tribute to NTR and is well directed by Krish with riveting narration focusing NTR's film career and personal life. He also wrote that the film only portrayed his rise to stardom despite conflicts involved him and praised Balakrishna's performance and termed it his best as he portrayed the character with finely grained techniques rather than his usual overt acting style.

Priyanka Sundar of Hindustan Times rated the movie 2/5 and wrote that the film portrays NTR as "larger-than-life" and as a perfect man and fails to examine at a deeper level into his character and motivations; his wife's character played by Vidya Balan is underdeveloped lacking chemistry with the lead character, Balakrishna. She concluded that it does not fully engage the audience with the lead character. S. Venkat Narayan, journalist and author of NTR: A Biography (1983), wrote in Hindustan Times applauding Krish for his undertaking to showcase a complex person such as NTR. He opined Balakrishna's performance in the first quarter as the younger NTR was not convincing enough but the rest was exceptional. He also praised Balan's performance, Gnana Shekar's cinematography and Keeravani's music. Krishna Sripada reviewing for The News Minute wrote that the film can be seen in different ways depending on the perspectives of the viewer – some seeing it as a documentation of NTR's life and career, while others finding it lacks dramatic impact and not as emotionally powerful as they had expected. He immensely praised Krish for bringing the right balance between these two. He wrote that the film serves as a nostalgic look back of Telugu cinema and fashion from that time period.

Janani Kumar of India Today rather 3/5 in her review and wrote that Balakrishna championed his role, but the film would have been realistic if it exhibited the struggles and faults apart from just NTR's achievements. She praised Balan's acting, background score and cinematography and summarized the film "falls short of becoming the best, leaving the star (N. T. Rama Rao) dehumanised". She also wrote of Balan with high praise for her acting skills and her efforts in learning an unfamiliar language. Hemanth Kumar reviewing for Firstpost rated 3/5 and wrote that the film serves as an extensive showcase of NTR's film career in Telugu cinema and that he was portrayed as "a perfect man, who always did the right thing" and thus an absence of "major drama or emotional upheavals". He opined that NTR's life until he entered politics was peaceful and thus there was no drama in the film. He praised the performances of Balakrishna and Balan, direction, background score and cinematography but could be exhausting due to its longer runtime.

Palaparthi Srividya of Cinema Express rated 2.5/5 and reviewed the film as a disappointment due to its inferior storytelling citing the director's misguided focus on representing NTR as a larger-than-life character rather on his life-story. She wrote that Balakrishna's performance was at peak during highly dramatic scenes and found the recreations of some of NTR's milestones – such as the camera trick done for Bhookailas (1958) and the famed dialogue from Daana Veera Soora Karna – to be exciting. Neeshita Nyayapati of The Times of India rated 3/5 and wrote that the film showcased NTR as "larger-than-life hero turned flawless god" and omits to display any struggles that he might have faced during his career. She praised the cast, direction, background score and cinematography but criticized the narration as uneven, slow moving with a non-human characterization of NTR. Pranita Jonnalagedda rated 3/5 in The Week and reviewed the film acts as a fitting antecedent for its sequel where the main drama in the life of NTR exists. She praised the direction, music, cinematography and Balan's acting despite her limited time-screen and noted the longer than usual runtime and the lack of any drama resulting in unstimulating narrative.

Box office 
NTR: Kathanayakudu was released to higher expectations from trade experts, a few days before the Hindu festival of Sankranthi to ride on the holidays surrounding it. It earned  on its first day. The film performed well in the US on the first day earning $443K–500K. Ram Charan-starred Telugu film Vinaya Vidheya Rama (2019) released 2 days after NTR: Kathanayakudu caused a split in box office collections. At the end of first week, The Hans India reported the US gross earnings to be at $825K.

During its theatrical run, the film failed to generate growth and ended up as a major commercial failure.

See also 
 Lakshmi's NTR, a 2019 Telugu film directed by Ram Gopal Varma based on N. T. Rama Rao's biography

Notes

References

External links
 

2019 films
Indian biographical films
Films directed by Krish
Films scored by M. M. Keeravani
Films set in Tamil Nadu
Films set in Andhra Pradesh
2010s Telugu-language films
Films set in Vijayawada
Films set in Chennai
Cultural depictions of Indira Gandhi
Films about films
Films about actors
Works about the Emergency (India)
Cultural depictions of actors
Biographical films about actors
P. V. Narasimha Rao